Pentti Veijo Isotalo (17 February 1927 – 9 July 2021) was a Finnish professional ice hockey player who played in the SM-liiga.  He was born in Tampere, Finland, and played for Ilves.  He was inducted into the Finnish Hockey Hall of Fame in 1985.

References

External links
 Finnish Hockey Hall of Fame bio

1927 births
2021 deaths
Ice hockey players at the 1952 Winter Olympics
Olympic ice hockey players of Finland
Ilves players
Ice hockey people from Tampere